The Chelsea Theater Center was a not-for-profit theater company founded in 1965 by Robert Kalfin, a graduate of the Yale School of Drama. It opened its doors in a church in the Chelsea district of Manhattan, then moved to the Brooklyn Academy of Music in 1968, where it was in residence for ten years.

History
Kalfin, the artistic producer, wanted to do the kind of work that had marked commercial off-Broadway in its prime but which, as a result of escalating production costs, could no longer realize a profit. By 1969, he was working with two new partners, also Yale graduates, Michael David, executive producer, and Burl Hash, production manager. They made it possible for him to realize the work he envisioned.

In the 1970s, the Chelsea produced plays that were unfamiliar to most spectators, even to many theater professionals. These included unusual European classics, new plays, and major works by well-known playwrights that were too complex and expensive for most non-profit theaters and too limited in audience appeal for most commercial producers.

For instance, the Chelsea staged the first uncut production of Jean Genet's seven-hour long The Screens and the first New York production of Peter Handke's Kaspar. The theater introduced New York audiences to the works of England's new generation of Royal Court Theatre playwrights, including Edward Bond, Christopher Hampton, David Storey and Heathcote Williams It unearthed works that had been lost to contemporary audiences, such as Kleist's The Prince of Homburg; Witkiewitz's surrealistic plays, The Crazy Locomotive and The Water Hen; John Gay's The Beggar's Opera and Polly; and Isaac Babel's Sunset. .

With Kaddish, a play based on a screenplay inspired by a poem by Allen Ginsberg, the Chelsea transformed two other genres into a multi-media theatrical event. With Yentl the Yeshiva Boy, it metamorphized a short story by Isaac Singer into a powerful dramatic production. Then with Candide, it integrated staples of commercial musical theater with experimental environmental staging. The Chelsea was well-regarded by theatre critics. Some performers left Broadway shows to appear on the Chelsea's stage in Brooklyn, and well-known artists such as Frank Langella, Meryl Streep and Hal Prince were anxious to work at the Chelesea. . Others who worked at the Chelsea early in their careers would become well known, including Glenn Close, Brent Spiner and Des McAnuff.

As described in Davi Napoleon's chronicle, Chelsea on the Edge: The Adventures of an American Theater, actors were extremely loyal to the Chelsea. The entire company of Strider, the Story of a Horse (based on a short story by Leo Tolstoy) petitioned Actors' Equity Association to permit it to rehearse without remuneration when the Chelsea had no money to continue production; in a rare move, the union agreed.

Eventually, funding sources for the non-profit theater decreased radically and the Chelsea could not adjust. The theater moved out of Brooklyn, attempting to find a wider audience in Manhattan, but it eventually met with defeat. In the process, they opened the off-Broadway Westside Theatre. The company folded in 1984.

References

Napoleon, Davi (1991).  Chelsea on the Edge — The Adventures of an American Theater. Iowa State University Press. . A chronicle of the onstage productions and offstage troubles at the Chelsea.
Prince, Harold (1974).  Contradictions — Notes on Twenty-Six Years in the Theatre (hardcover). Dodd, Mead. . The autobiography features a chapter on his production of Candide at the Chelsea.
Bennetts, Leslie (11 November 1979). "The Travels of Strider — Leningrad to Broadway". The New York Times. p. 5. 
Feingold, Michael (21 January 1981). "Death by Funding: RIP Chelsea".The Village Voice. p. 75.
Hewes, Henry (29 July 1972). "An Egoless Theater". Saturday Review. p. 66.
Napoleon, Davi (February 1980). "Staging the Unexpected at the Chelsea Theater Center". Showbill. Stories of adventurous productions the Chelsea moved from Off-Broadway to Broadway.
Napoleon, Davi (October 1977). "The Chelsea Theater Center — Bringing Film, Video, and Projections to the Stage".  Theatre Crafts. 
Napoleon, Davi (1 July 1976). "Whatever Became of Megan Terry?" in SoHo Weekly News (New York). p. 30. Interview with Megan Terry about assorted work, including production of her play, Hothouse, at the Chelsea. Produced The all Mime play TAROT, written, Directed, By Joseph Lennon McCord. AKA RUBBER DUCK.
Napoleon, Davi (23 December 1983). "Page. Stage, Film — Yentl Re-Viewed". The Ann Arbor News.  Sec. C, p. 1.
Napoleon, Davi (January–February 1976). "Dawn Song — The Play Chelsea Didn't Produce".  Alternative Theater.  p. 4. 
Napoleon, Davi (2 May 1977). "Salvation as an Erotic Experience". Courier Life Newspapers (Brooklyn, New York).  p. 31. Review of Robert Kalfin's production of Happy End at the Chelsea. The Chelsea later moved the production to Broadway. 
Napoleon, Davi (24 March 1975). "Santa Anita '42 Players Remember the Camps". Courier Life Newspapers (Brooklyn, New York).  p. 17. Interviews with Sab Shimono and others who had first-hand experiences similar to those of the characters they played in this production at the Chelsea.
Napoleon, Davi (16 August 1976). "A Star is Born in Brooklyn: Tovah (Yentl) Feldshuh Goes to Stratford".  Courier Life Newspapers (Brooklyn, New York). p. 20. Details of conflict between Robert Kalfin and Tovah Feldshuh on interpretation of Chelsea production of Yentl.
Napoleon, Davi (29 November 1976). "Backstage at BAM: An Abundance of Activity". Courier Life Newspapers (Brooklyn, New York). p 32. Chronicles a typical day at the Brooklyn Academy of Music with description of a Chelsea rehearsal of Lincoln.
Napoleon, Davi (19 May 1975). "Backstage at Chelsea: The Real Life Drama Behind the Onstage Drama". Courier Life Newspapers (Brooklyn, New York). p. 19. Describes a rehearsal of the Chelsea's production of Polly.
Napoleon, Davi (18 December 1975). "Blossom Took a Long Road to Chelsea Stardom". The Phoenix (Brooklyn, New York).  p. 17. Profile of Roberts Blossom, with special attention to his work on Ice Age. 
Napoleon, Davi (4 December 1975). "Boreum Hill Actress Forsakes Broadway for Pinteresque Soap". The Phoenix (Brooklyn, New York). p. 13. Profile of Dale Soules, describing why she left The Magic Show to appear in The Family at the Chelsea.
Napoleon, Davi (October 1977). "Careers: A Part for You in the Theater". Seventeen.  p. 54. Tips for teens on how to break into the backstage theater world, with comments from Michael David and Sherman Warner of the Chelsea. 
Napoleon, Davi (3 January 1977). "Chelsea Goes Loco, Gears Up for Speed Trip". Courier Life Newspapers (Brooklyn, New York).  Napoleon is a fly on the wall at Des McAnuff's rehearsal of The Crazy Locomotive with Glenn Close and other luminaries.
Napoleon, Davi (23 February 1976). "Chelsea Graduates to Brooklyn". Courier Life Newspapers (Brooklyn, New York). p. 20. Brief history of Chelsea's first years at the Brooklyn Academy of Music. 
Napoleon, Davi (8 March 1976). "Chelsea Resembles England's Royal Court". Courier Life Newspapers (Brooklyn, New York).  p. 24.
Napoleon, Davi (11 April 1977). "Chelsea Theater Center — Highlights in the History of the Theater that Left New York". Courier Life Newspapers (Brooklyn, New York).  Photo essay. 
Napoleon, Davi (8 March 19 May 1976). "Chelsea Thrives in Brooklyn, Triumphs Over Broadway". Courier Life Newspapers (Brooklyn, New York). p. 24.
Napoleon, Davi (23 January 1975). "Chelsea's Michael David". The Phoenix (Brooklyn, New York). p. 14. Profile of executive director Michael David. 
Napoleon, Davi (9 February 1976). "Love Letters to Chelsea: Subscribers Rally to Help Theater Meet Deficit". Courier Life Newspapers (Brooklyn, New York).  p. 64.
Napoleon, Davi (29 December 1975). "Lynn Ann Leveridge of Chelsea's Yentl: Actress Discusses Judaism, Feminism, and Theater Life".  Courier Life Newspapers (Brooklyn, New York). p. 24.
Napoleon, Davi (16 February 1976). "Music's Not All That's Happening at BAM". Courier Life Newspapers (Brooklyn, New York).  p. 19. Annotated photo spread of theater and dance events, recent productions at the Chelsea. 
Napoleon, Davi (11 September 1975). "Portrait of the Producer as a Runaway Scholar".  The Phoenix (Brooklyn, New York). p 17. Profile of productions director Burl Hash. 
Severo, Richard (28 May 1974). "The Chelsea: Success Story in Brooklyn, of All Places".  The New York Times.
Tallmer,Jerry (20 March 1973). "A Theater Grows in Brooklyn". New York Post.

External links
 Chelsea Theatre Center at the Internet off-Broadway Database 
Chelsea Theater Center records, 1968-1984, held by the Billy Rose Theatre Division, New York Public Library for the Performing Arts
Chelsea Theater Center articles in The New York Times

1965 establishments in New York City
Culture of Brooklyn
Culture of Manhattan
Former theatres in Manhattan
Arts organizations established in 1965
Non-profit organizations based in New York City
1984 disestablishments in New York (state)
Arts organizations disestablished in 1984
Defunct Theatre companies in New York City